Gwalior Engineering College, popularly known as GEC, has been established by Mahatma Dhule Education Society.started in year 2003. The GEC has been established with the object of providing Technical Education. It has been planned for development with buildings, laboratories, workshop, computer center, library, audio-visual teaching-aids, games & sports facilities and other recreational facilities.

Campus 
The college campus is growing compatibly with large mansions measuring a total area of 14470 sq. m. with a workshop of covered area 1125 sq. m. All the lecture halls, tutorial rooms, drawing hall, laboratories, library, principal room, boys and girls common rooms, office, faculty room, toilet blocks etc. have been constructed as per norms laid down by the All India Council For Technical Education, New Delhi.

External links

All India Council for Technical Education
Engineering colleges in Madhya Pradesh
Universities and colleges in Gwalior